The 1994 San Francisco State Gators football team represented San Francisco State University as a member of the Northern California Athletic Conference (NCAC) during the 1994 NCAA Division II football season. Led by third-year head coach Dick Mannini, San Francisco State compiled an overall record of 1–8 with a mark of 0–3 in conference play, placing last out of four teams in the NCAC. For the season the team was outscored by its opponents 286 to 212. The Gators played home games at Cox Stadium in San Francisco.

1994 was the final season for San Francisco State Gators football program. It was disbanded in early 1995 to free up funding for women's athletics at the school. San Francisco State was the third bay-area college team to drop football in three years. Two of the Gators traditional rivals, Santa Clara and Cal State Hayward had previously dropped their football programs after the 1992 and 1993 season, respectively.

Schedule

References

San Francisco State
San Francisco State Gators football seasons
San Francisco State Gators football